Colin Edwards (born 1974) is an American motorcycle racer.

Colin Edwards may also refer to:
 Colin Edwards (footballer) (1991–2013), Guyanese footballer
 Colin Edwards (journalist) (1924–1994), British journalist and documentarian

See also
Demarco (musician) (born 1982), born Collin Edwards, Jamaican recording artist